Omar Abdullah Al-Ghamdi (born 11 April 1979) is a retired Saudi Arabian football player who played as defensive midfielder and played at left back.

Club career

Al-Hilal
In 1997, Al-Hilal signed Omar Al-Ghamdi, he was part of Al-Hilal team that won the Asian Super Cup and Asian Champions League in 2000. He won every trophy at Al-Hilal. On 14 March 2010, Omar played his last match for Al-Hilal which was against Al-Shabab which ended 2-1 win for Al-Hilal. He left in 2010.

Al-Shabab
On 21 June 2010, Omar went to Al-Shabab from Al-Hilal as part of a swap deal which Al-Hilal got Waleed Al-Gizani from Al-Shabab. On 14 August 2010, he played his league debut against Al-Raed which Al-Shabab lost 2-1. On 29 September 2011, Omar made his first assist for Al-Shabab against Al-Raed which he assisted Hassan Muath in the 40th minute which was a reason why they won 2-1. On 30 November 2011, Omar assisted Fahad Hamad in the 61 minute which made Al-Shabab win 1-0 against Al-Ettifaq. On 2 February 2012, Omar was sent off against Ittihad in the 38 minute for a second yellow card, but Al-Shabab still won 2-0. In 2012, he won the first and only Saudi Professional League for Al-Shabab. In 2014, Omar won the King Cup and the Super Cup for Al-Shabab. On 26 March 2017, Omar announced that he will retire at the end of the season. On 17 April 2015, Omar played his last league match against Al-Taawoun which Al-Shabab drew 1-1. On 23 August 2015, Omar officially retired from football after a playing career that lasted 17 years.

International career
Omar made his play debut for the Saudi Arabia national team at the 2000 AFC Asian Cup. He is a member of the Saudi Arabia national team and was called up to the squad for the 2002 FIFA World Cup and 2006 FIFA World Cup. On 6 September 2008, Omar played his last match for the national team which was against Iran which he replaced Mohammad Al-Shalhoub in the 67th minute, the match ended 1-1. After 78 caps for the Saudi national team, he retired in 2008.

Hounors

Club

Al-Hilal
Saudi Professional League (4): 1997-98, 2001-02, 2004-05, 2009-10
Saudi Crown Prince Cup (7): 1999-2000, 2002–03, 2004–05, 2005–06, 2007–08, 2008-09, 2009-10
Prince Faisal bin Fahd Cup (3): 2000, 2005, 2006
Saudi Founder's Cup (1): 1999
AFC Champions League (1): 1999-2000
Asian Cup Winners' Cup (1): 2001-02
Asian Super Cup (1): 2000

Al-Shabab
Saudi Professional League (1): 2011-12
Saudi Super Cup (1): 2014
King Cup (1): 2014

References

External links

1979 births
Living people
Sportspeople from Mecca
Saudi Arabian footballers
Saudi Arabia international footballers
2000 AFC Asian Cup players
2002 FIFA World Cup players
2006 FIFA World Cup players
2007 AFC Asian Cup players
Al Hilal SFC players
Association football midfielders
Al-Shabab FC (Riyadh) players
Saudi First Division League players
Saudi Professional League players